Bong hits may refer to:
 Smoking a bong
 Bong Hits 4 Jesus, the court case allowing schools to suppress drug speech
 Greatest Hits from the Bong by Cypress Hill